Fitzwilliam may refer to:

People
 Fitzwilliam (surname), including a list of people with the name
 Earl Fitzwilliam, a title in the Peerage of Ireland and the Peerage of Great Britain
 Viscount FitzWilliam, a title in the Peerage of Ireland

Places
 Fitzwilliam, West Yorkshire, England
Fitzwilliam railway station
 Fitzwilliam, New Hampshire, U.S.
 Fitzwilliam Strait, a waterway through the central Canadian Arctic Archipelago 
 Mount Fitzwilliam, in the Canadian Rockies

Other uses
 Fitzwilliam College, Cambridge, a constituent colleges of the University of Cambridge, England
 Fitzwilliam Museum, the art and antiquities museum of the University of Cambridge
 Fitzwilliam Darcy, a fictional character from Jane Austen's Pride and Prejudice

See also
 
 Fitzwilliam Sonatas, an arrangement of Handel's recorder sonatas
 Fitzwilliam Virginal Book, source of keyboard music in the Elizabethan and Jacobean periods in England